The Red Cat is a 1920 German silent film directed by Erich Schönfelder.

Cast
Tassia Schirkoff
Sig Arno
Hans Junkermann
Rosa Valetti

References

External links

Films of the Weimar Republic
Films directed by Erich Schönfelder
German silent feature films
German black-and-white films